Will Goodbody (born 1977) is an Irish journalist. In November 2018, it was announced that he would succeed David Murphy as the Business Editor for RTÉ News.

Goodbody began his journalism career in the print media as a markets reporter with the Sunday Business Post in 2000. The following year he made the move to television when he joined TV3 News. Over the following two years he worked as a general news reporter.

In 2003 Goodbody joined RTÉ News where he initially worked as a reporter and occasional editor on its flagship morning radio news programme, Morning Ireland on RTÉ Radio 1. In 2005 he moved to the news desk, from where he worked as a general news journalist in Dublin and around the country and part-time Deputy Programme Editor for RTÉ News. Goodbody was RTÉ's Science and Technology correspondent between 2013 and 2018.

References

1977 births
Living people
RTÉ newsreaders and journalists